Arends' golden mole (Carpitalpa arendsi') is a species of mammal in the family Chrysochloridae. It is found in Mozambique and Zimbabwe. Its natural habitats are temperate forests, subtropical or tropical dry, and moist montane forests, dry lowland grassland, arable land, pasture, plantations, rural gardens, and urban areas.

It is the only species in the genus Carpitalpa. It was moved from the genus Chlorotalpa''.

It was first described by Lundholm, who named it for Nicolas Arends, taxidermist at the Kaffrarian Museum (now the Amathole Museum, in King William's Town, South Africa) who captured the specimen.

References

Afrosoricida
Taxonomy articles created by Polbot
Mammals described in 1955